Cololejeunea elegans is a species of liverworts in the family Lejeuneaceae. It is found in Cameroon.

References

External links 
 Cololejeunea elegans at Tropicos
 Cololejeunea elegans at The Plant List

Lejeuneaceae
Plants described in 1891